Parliamentary elections were held in Nauru on 14 November 1992. All candidates ran as independents. Following the elections, Bernard Dowiyogo was re-elected President by the Parliament by ten votes to seven.

The only female member in the previous Parliament, Ruby Dediya (MP for Anetan/Ewa), lost her seat in the elections. The resulting Parliament was composed exclusively of men.

Results

References

Nauru
1992 in Nauru
Elections in Nauru
Non-partisan elections
Election and referendum articles with incomplete results